I-16 was one of five Type C cruiser submarines of the C1 sub-class built for the Imperial Japanese Navy, Commissioned in 1940, she deployed a midget submarine for the attack on Pearl Harbor and for an attack on ships at Diego-Suarez in Madagascar, conducted an anti-shipping patrol in the Indian Ocean, and took part in the Guadalcanal campaign, New Guinea campaign, and Bougainville campaign before she was sunk in May 1944.

Design and description 

They displaced  surfaced and  submerged.

For surface running, the boats were powered by two  diesel engines, each driving one propeller shaft. When submerged each propeller was driven by a  electric motor. They could reach  on the surface and  underwater.

The boats were armed with eight internal bow  torpedo tubes and carried a total of 20 torpedoes. They were also armed with a single /40 deck gun and two single or twin mounts for  Type 96 anti-aircraft guns. They were equipped to carry one Type A midget submarine aft of the conning tower.

Construction and commissioning
I-16 was laid down on 15 September 1937 at the Mitsubishi's Kobe Yard in Kobe, Japan, as Submarine No. 44, the first of eight submarines of the C1 subclass. Renamed I-16 on 1 June 1938, she was launched on 8 July 1938 and towed to Kure Naval Arsenal at Kure for completion. She was completed and commissioned on 30 March 1940.

Service history

Pre-World War II
Upon completion, I-16 was attached to the Yokosuka Naval District. By 15 November 1941, I-16 was assigned to Submarine Division 1 in Submarine Squadron 1 in the 6th Fleet.

At the Kure Navy Club in Kure, Japan, on 17 November 1941, the commander of Submarine Division 3 briefed the commanding officers of the five converted submarines on the upcoming attack on Pearl Harbor and on the role of their submarines in it. He had been designated the commander of the Special Attack Unit, made up of all five submarines, each of which was to launch a Type A midget submarine off Pearl Harbor so that the midget submarines could participate in the attack. I-22 was to serve as flagship of the Special Attack unit.

On 18 November 1941, the five submarines moved from Kure to the Kamegakubi Naval Proving Ground, where each embarked a Type A midget submarine. At 02:15 on 19 November 1941, the five submarines got underway from Kamegakubi bound for the Hawaiian Islands, taking a direct route that took them south of Midway Atoll. While at sea, they received the message "Climb Mount Niitaka 1208" from the Combined Fleet on 2 December 1941, indicating that war with the Allies would commence on 8 December 1941 Japan time, which was on 7 December 1941 on the other side of the International Date Line in Hawaii.

Pearl Harbor
She and the other four "mother" submarines then proceeded to the planned recovery area for their midget submarines west of Lanai, where they spent the night of 7–8 December 1941. At 22:41 on 7 December, she received a message from No. 16 describing the air attack on Pearl Harbor as successful, and at 00:51 on 8 December she received another message that read "Unable to navigate." She never heard from No. 16 again. Early on 9 December 1941, I-18, I-20, and I-24 received orders to leave the recovery area, but I-16 and I-22 stayed until 11 December 1941. None of the five midget submarines returned. I-16 departed Hawaiian waters on 12 December and proceeded to Kwajalein, which she reached on 20 December 1941.

December 1941–April 1942

Ordered home to Japan to take part in the testing of access tubes that would allow the members of a midget submarine crew to board their craft while the "mother" submarine remained submerged, I-16 got underway from Kwajalein on 25 December 1941. She arrived at Yokosuka on 3 January 1942 and later moved to Kure to take part in the tests.

During I-16′s stay in Japan, the German naval staff in Berlin formally requested on 27 March 1942 that Japan begin attacks on Allied convoys in the Indian Ocean. On 8 April 1942, the Japanese formally agreed to meet this request by dispatching submarines to operate off the coast of East Africa, and that day they withdrew Submarine Division 1 of Submarine Squadron 8 from its base at Kwajalein to Japan. That morning, the commander of the 6th Fleet, Vice Admiral Teruhisa Komatsu, the commander of Submarine Squadron 8, their staffs, and the midget submarine crews paid a courtesy call on the commander-in-chief of the Combined Fleet, Admiral Isoroku Yamamoto, aboard his flagship, the battleship , at Hashirajima anchorage. After the visit with Yamamoto, the detachment got underway at 11:00, bound for Penang in Japanese-occupied British Malaya.

During the detachment′s voyage, 16 United States Army Air Forces B-25 Mitchell bombers launched by the aircraft carrier  struck targets on Honshu in the Doolittle Raid on 18 April 1942. The detachment received orders from the 6th Fleet that day to divert from its voyage and head northeast, passing north of the Bonin Islands, to intercept the U.S. Navy task force that had launched the strike. The detachment failed to find the U.S. ships and soon resumed its voyage.

I-30 and Aikoku Maru called at Penang from 20 April to 22 April 1942 before heading into the Indian Ocean to conduct an advance reconnaissance of the "A" Detachment′s planned operating area. The rest of the "A" Detachment reached Penang on 27 April 1942, where the seaplane carrier  — which had undergone modifications allowing her to carry Type A midget submarines — rendezvoused with it. I-16, I-18, and I-20 each embarked a midget submarine at Penang.

Indian Ocean operation

I-16 and the other "A" detachment units got underway from Penang on 30 April 1942, headed westward into the Indian Ocean with I-10 serving as the detachment′s flagship. The submarines refueled at sea from Aikoku Maru and Hōkoku Maru on 5, 10, and 15 May 1942. I-16 suffered a mishap southeast of Madagascar on 17 May 1942 when seawater flooded her port diesel engine in heavy seas, but her crew made repairs.

I-10′s Yokosuka E14Y1 (Allied reporting name "Glen") floatplane began reconnaissance flights over ports in South Africa by reconnoitering Durban on 20 May 1942, followed by flights over East London, Port Elizabeth, and Simon's Town over the next week, and by 24 May the "A" detachment submarines were encountering heavy Allied shipping traffic as they approached East Africa. On the night of 29 May, I-10′s floatplane flew over Diego-Suarez, Madagascar, sighting the British battleship  among the ships anchored there. The "A" detachment commander selected Diego-Suarez as the target for a midget submarine attack, scheduled for 30 May 1942.

I-16′s midget was never heard from again, but I-20′s midget torpedoed Ramillies and the tanker British Loyalty, damaging the former and sinking the latter, before it, too, was lost. The body of a Japanese sailor found on 2 June 1942 washed up on a beach near Diego Suarez probably was that of one of the two men aboard I-16′s midget.

After the midget submarine attack, the "A" detachment began anti-shipping operations. On 26 July 1942, she conducted a reconnaissance of Diego Garcia, and she returned to Penang on 10 August 1942. She soon got underway for Japan and arrived at Yokosuka on 26 August 1942 to undergo an overhaul.

Guadalcanal campaign
Meanwhile, the Guadalcanal campaign had begun on 7 August 1942 with U.S. amphibious landings on Guadalcanal, Tulagi, Florida Island, Gavutu, and Tanambogo in the southeastern Solomon Islands. With her overhaul complete, I-16 got underway from Yokosuka on 17 October 1942 to take part in the fighting in the Solomons. On 2 November 1942, she arrived at an anchorage off Shortland Island in the Shortland Islands, where I-16, I-20, and I-24 formed an attack group and each received orders to load a midget submarine delivered by the seaplane tender .

I-16 embarked the midget submarine No. 30 at 13:00 on 4 November 1942, and that day she and I-24 got underway for the Indispensable Strait. She reached her launch area off Guadalcanal at 06:00 on 7 November 1942. At 02:00 on 11 November, No. 30′s two-man crew manned their craft, and at 03:49 I-16 submerged when she sighted a United States Navy PT boat. No. 30′s steering system suffered damage during her launch, and No. 30 lost steering at 04:24. No. 30 aborted her mission, surfaced, and headed toward Japanese-held Kamimbo Bay on the northwestern coast of Guadalcanal, but her crew sighted an Allied aircraft and scuttled her. They swam to shore, arriving safely at the Japanese midget submarine base at Maravovo, Guadalcanal, at 19:00.

I-16, meanwhile, was returning to the Shortland anchorage. While en route, she received orders on 13 November 1942 to locate the crippled Japanese battleship , which had been crippled off northwestern Guadalcanal in the First Naval Battle of Guadalcanal early that morning, and sink her if she was still afloat. I-16 reached the area of the battle but failed to find Hiei, which sank early that evening.

At the Shortland anchorage, I-16 embarked the midget submarine No. 10 and again departed for Guadalcanal, planning to target Allied ships off Lungga Point on Guadalcanal′s northern coast. At 02:55 on 28 November 1942, she launched No. 10 north of Guadalcanal  from Savo Island. No. 10 and her two-man crew were never heard from again.

I-16 embarked the midget submarine No. 22 at the Shortland anchorage and returned to the waters off Guadalcanal. Both torpedoes missed. No. 22′s crew scuttled her and swam safely to Guadalcanal at Cape Esperance.

I-16 next received orders to take part in an effort to resupply by submarine the Japanese forces fighting on Guadalcanal. She departed Truk on 6 January 1943 on her first supply run, carrying supplies in drums. Arriving at Cape Esperance on 13 January 1943, she found no Daihatsu-class landing craft waiting to unload her because of Allied aircraft patrolling over the area, so her crew threw the supply drums overboard for the Daihatsus to retrieve from the water later and she got back underway, heading for Rabaul on New Britain. She returned to Cape Esperance on 25 January 1943 and unloaded 18 tons of supplies in containers.

The Japanese completed Operation Ke on 9 February 1943 after evacuating 11,700 personnel from Guadalcanal.

On 7 May 1943, the U.S. Navy submarine rescue vessel  salvaged a Japanese midget submarine off the north coast of Guadalcanal, towed her to Kukum Bay on the coast of Guadalcanal that month, and then transported her to Nouméa, New Caledonia, in June 1943. She eventually was placed on display at the Submarine Force Library and Museum in Groton, Connecticut. She has been identified as both No. 10 and No. 30, and as No. 8, which I-20 launched on 2 December 1942.

New Guinea campaign

I-16 next received orders to carry supplies to Japanese forces fighting in the New Guinea campaign. On her first supply run, she unloaded 40 tons of cargo, including 30 supply drums, at Lae on the coast of New Guinea. She then headed for Rabaul, and during the voyage collided underwater with I-20 on 2 April 1943. After calling at Rabaul, she got underway for Japan, where she arrived at Yokosuka on 16 April 1943 to undergo repairs and a refit.

Once again ready for sea, I-16 departed Yokosuka on 21 September 1943, called at Truk, and then resumed her New Guinea supply runs. She called at Sio, New Guinea, on her first two runs on 17 and 25 October 1943. On her third run, she disembarked 30 soldiers of the 85th Guard Unit at Sio on 2 November 1943. She visited Sio again on 9 and 20 November 1943.

On 24 November 1943, I-16 embarked the newly appointed commander of the 9th Fleet, Vice Admiral Yoshikazu Endo, and his staff at Rabaul in addition to cargo for New Guinea. After calling at Sio on 27 November 1943 to unload her cargo, she proceeded to Wewak, New Guinea, where she arrived on 30 November 1943 and Endo and his staff disembarked. I-16 subsequently made her last New Guinea supply run, visiting Sio on 15 December 1943, then suffered damage at Rabaul in an Allied air raid on 25 December 1943. She departed Rabaul that day bound for Truk, then set course for Yokosuka, where she arrived on 1 January 1944 and was drydocked to undergo repairs.

Later operations

I-16′s repairs were completed in early February 1944, and on 17 March 1944 she departed Yokosuka and proceeded to Truk, which became her new base.

At 08:00 on 14 May 1944, I-16 got underway from Truk for a supply run to Buin on Bougainville to deliver rice in  rubber bags to Japanese forces fighting in the Bougainville campaign. She transmitted a message to the commander of Submarine Squadron 7 on Saipan in the Mariana Islands to inform him that her estimated time of arrival at Buin was 20:00 on 22 May 1944. Fleet Radio Unit Pacific (FRUPAC), a U.S. Navy signals intelligence and cryptographic unit in Hawaii, intercepted and decrypted the message, which was passed through channels to the commander of U.S. Navy Escort Division 39 at Tulagi.

Loss 
England, George, and Raby began a line-abreast sonar sweep, and at 13:35 England detected I-16 on sonar. England attacked I-16 at 13:41 with the first of five "Hedgehog" spigot mortar barrages. The first debris reached the surface 20 minutes later and included shreds of cork, deck planking, pieces of cabinetry, other objects, and finally a sealed rubber container with a bag of rice inside.

On 25 June 1944, the Imperial Japanese Navy declared I-16 to be presumed lost in the Solomon Islands with her entire crew of 107. She was stricken from the Navy list on 10 October 1944.

Wreck 

Sinkings summary 
I-16 sank four ships during her career with a combined loss of 14 lives.

Notes

References

Footnotes

Bibliography
 

Type C1 submarines
Ships built by Mitsubishi Heavy Industries
1937 ships
World War II submarines of Japan
Attack on Pearl Harbor
Japanese submarines lost during World War II
World War II shipwrecks in the Pacific Ocean
Ships lost with all hands
Maritime incidents in April 1943
Maritime incidents in May 1944
Submarines sunk by United States warships